In the 2006–07 season, Partizani Tirana competed in the Kategoria Superiore for the sixth consecutive season and finished in fourth place. The club also reached the semi-finals of the Albanian Cup where it was eliminated by Teuta Durrës on the away goals rule.

Competitions

Kategoria Superiore

League table

Results summary

Results by round

Matches

Albanian Cup

Third round

Fourth round

Quarter-finals

Semi-finals

UEFA Intertoto Cup

First round

Notes

References

External links
Official website 

Partizani
FK Partizani Tirana seasons